Denver, Ohio may refer to:

 Denver, Ross County, Ohio, an unincorporated community
 Denver, Wood County, Ohio, an unincorporated community